David Judge may refer to:

 David Judge (actor) (born 1983), English actor
 David Judge (field hockey) (born 1936), Irish field hockey international
 David Judge (political scientist) (born 1950), British political scientist